Stadshagen is a district   in Stockholm Municipality in Stockholm, Sweden.

Location 
Stadshagen is located in the northwest part of the island of Kungsholmen.
Stadshagen borders the districts of Kungsholmen through Lilla Västerbron, Marieberg and Igeldammsgatan; 
Kristineberg through Lindhagensgatan; Marieberg through part of Rålambshovsleden and to Huvudsta in Solna municipality through the Karlbergskanalen.

History
One of Stockholm's major hospitals, Saint Göran Hospital (Sankt Görans Sjukhus), opened in 1888 in this district. Saint Göran Church (Sankt Görans kyrka) first opened in 1910 as a chapel designed by architect Gustaf Améen (1864–1949). The present church was designed by architect Adrian Langendal (1904-1970) and was inaugurated in 1958.

The Blue line metro station of Stadshagen was opened in 1975 between Fridhemsplan and Västra skogen. Stadshagen metro station was inaugurated on 31 August 1975.

References

Districts of Stockholm